Vladimír Roy (17 April 1885, in Kochanovce (Kochanócz), Austria-Hungary – 6 February 1936, in Nový Smokovec, Czechoslovakia) was a Slovak poet, translator and opera librettist.

He provided the libretto for the opera Wieland der Schmied (:cs:Kovář Wieland (opera)) composed in 1881-90 by the Slovak composer Ján Levoslav Bella.

References

1885 births
1936 deaths
Slovak poets
Slovak translators
Translators from English
Translators from French
Translators from Hungarian
People from Trenčín District
Burials at National Cemetery in Martin
20th-century translators
Czechoslovak poets